The Conference of Parliamentary Committees for Union Affairs of Parliaments of the European Union (COSAC) is a conference of Members of the European Parliament (MEPs) and national Members of Parliament (MPs) who are drawn from parliamentary committees responsible for European Union affairs.

History and role

COSAC was founded in 1989 on a proposal of Laurent Fabius, then President of the French National Assembly and at the same time an MEP on the European Parliament Committee on Constitutional Affairs (AFCO). COSAC meets twice a year in the member state that holds the rotating Presidency of the Council of the European Union.

The conference is mainly intended for personal contacts between Members of National Parliaments and MEPs, and for exchanges of information. The conference is therefore interested in the means by which the parliaments are able to co-operate and communicate with each other via interparliamentary meetings, and through the IPEX scrutiny website. The 17 Biannual COSAC report from April 2012 focused on recent developments in parliamentary scrutiny and the parliaments' use of IPEX.

COSAC may also adopt contributions addressed to the EU institutions. COSAC has gained the right to submit contributions and examine proposals on EU law relating to Justice and Home Affairs and saw its role further expand under the Treaty of Lisbon with provisions for increased involvement of national parliaments in EU affairs.

Name
COSAC is a French acronym for the conference's former name "Conférence des organes spécialisés dans les affaires communautaires et européennes des parlements de l'Union européenne" (Conference of Community and European Affairs Committees of Parliaments of the European Union). It is known by similar terms such as the Conference of European Community Affairs Committees and under the Treaty of Lisbon COSAC's name is listed as the conference of Parliamentary Committees for Union Affairs.

List of European affairs committees

See also
 European Assizes
 National parliaments of the European Union
 Joint parliamentary meeting on the Future of Europe
 List of acronyms: European sovereign-debt crisis

References

External links
Conference of Community and European Affairs Committees of Parliaments of the European Union
Cooperation between the European Parliament and National Parliaments

Politics of the European Union
European Parliament